Vinicius García Del'Amore (born 5 January 1997) is a Brazilian footballer who plays for Altos as a defender.

Club career
Born in São Bernardo do Campo, Del'Amore joined the youth academy of Corinthians at the age of 11. Although, he later switched to Palmeiras, he returned to his former club after four years in 2015. In February 2017, he was promoted to the senior team and signed a contract till December 2019. Subsequently, he was loaned out to Fortaleza for the 2017 season. On 16 March, he made his debut for the club in a 3–2 victory against Tiradentes in Campeonato Cearense.

On 28 December 2017, Del'Amore joined Londrina, again on loan.

Club statistics

References

External links

1997 births
Living people
Association football defenders
Brazilian footballers
Sport Club Corinthians Paulista players
Fortaleza Esporte Clube players
Londrina Esporte Clube players
Campeonato Brasileiro Série B players
Campeonato Brasileiro Série C players
People from São Bernardo do Campo
Footballers from São Paulo (state)